The Men's 50 km classical mass start was part of the FIS Nordic World Ski Championships 2005's events held in Oberstdorf, Germany. The race went underway on 27 February 2005 at 12:30 CET. The defending world champion was Czech Republic's Martin Koukal, then in freestyle and interval start.

Results

References

FIS Nordic World Ski Championships 2005